Realism, Realistic, or Realists may refer to:

In the arts 
Realism (arts), the general attempt to depict subjects truthfully in different forms of the arts
Arts movements related to realism include:

Classical Realism
Literary realism, a movement from the mid 19th to the early 20th century
Neorealism (art)
Italian neorealism (film)
Indian neorealism (film)
New realism, a movement founded in 1960
Realism (art movement), 19th-century painting group
Theatrical realism, one of the many types of theatre such as Naturalism
Vienna School of Fantastic Realism, an art movement
Socialist realism, an art style developed in the Soviet Union

In philosophy 
Philosophical realism
Related realist philosophies include:

Aesthetic realism (metaphysics)
Agential realism (Barad)
Australian realism
Austrian realism
Conceptualist realism (Wiggins)
Critical realism (disambiguation)
Dialectical realism (Hacking)
Direct realism
Empirical realism
Entity realism
Epistemic structural realism
Epistemological realism
Hermeneutic realism (Heidegger)
Internal realism, also known as "pragmatic realism" (Putnam)
Local realism, the view held by the authors of the EPR paper
Logical realism, the conviction the rules of logic are mind-independent
Metaphysical realism
Modal realism
Model-dependent realism (Hawking and Mlodinow)
Moderate realism
Moral realism
Naïve realism
New realism (philosophy)
Ontic structural realism
Peircean realism
Perspectival realism
Platonic realism
Quasi-realism
Rational realism (Bardili)
Realistic monism (G. Strawson)
Realistic rationalism (Katz)
Referential realism
Romantic realism
Scientific realism
Musgrave's scientific realism
Scotistic realism
Semantic realism (epistemology) (a position criticized by Dummett)
Semantic realism (philosophy of science) (Psillos)
Semirealism (Chakravartty)
Set-theoretic realism (Maddy)
Speculative realism
Subtle realism
Theological critical realism
Transcendental realism (Schelling, Schopenhauer, Bhaskar)
Truth-value link realism (a position criticized by Dummett)

In the social sciences 
Realist approaches in the social sciences include:
Ethnographic realism, either a descriptive word, i.e. of or relating to the first-hand participant-observation practices of ethnographers, or a writing style or genre that narrates in a similar fashion.
Legal realism, the view that jurisprudence should emulate the methods of natural science, i.e., rely on empirical evidence
Realism (international relations), the view that world politics is driven by competitive self-interest
Classical realism (international relations)
Neorealism (international relations)
Structural realism, in international relations
Subtle realism, in social science research methodology

Media
Realistic (album), an album by Ivy
Realism (Steril album), an album by Steril
Realism (The Magnetic Fields album), an album by The Magnetic Fields

Politics
Czech Realist Party, former political party in Austria-Hungary
Realists (political party), conservative political party in the Czech Republic

Other uses
Realistic (brand), a brand of home audio electronics produced by RadioShack

See also
Anti-realism
Classical realism (disambiguation)
Critical realism (disambiguation)
Depressive realism
Digitalism
Irrealism (disambiguation)
Neorealism (disambiguation)
Pseudorealism
Raëlism
Reality
Real (disambiguation)

Realism